Many sports in Iran are both traditional and modern. Tehran, for example, was the first city in West Asia to host the Asian Games in 1974, and continues to host and participate in major international sporting events to this day. Freestyle wrestling has been traditionally regarded as Iran's national sport, however today, football is the most popular sport in Iran. Because of economic sanctions, the annual government's budget for sport was about $80 million in 2010 or about $1 per person.

History
Sports and athletic exercises were among the most fundamental daily pursuits of the people in Ancient Iran.

The society attached special status to sportsmen who thanks to their physical strength and courage, defended their family and homeland when the need arose.

They were welcomed everywhere with much enthusiasm, the people took much pride in their sportsmen and praised and admired them for their courageous deeds.

According to their religious teaching, the Iranian Zoroastrians in their prayers sought first the beauties of heaven and then physical strength and mental power. They believed in a healthy and powerful body.

The ancient Iranians attached spiritual meaning to their spoils activities which they modeled on their weapons. Even the Mages (religious sages) while engaging in prayers in their temples held a mace in their hands, not unlike the British bishops who hung swords on their belts.

Avesta, the sacred book of the ancient religions of Iran glorifies the champions and sportsmen as much, if not more than saints and men of God. The older generation made arrangements for the ancient narratives and epics to be read to the young either from books or from those who had learned them from their elders.

This tradition has survived until today and outlived the rest of ages. Thus, even today, it can be observed that among the tribes and in the tea houses storytelling is practiced with the same enthusiasm as it was in bygone ages.

The extent to which the Iranians were interested in their heroes and champions is revealed, among other things, by the fact that in the Persian language there are over 30 words to label the concept of a hero or champion.

In Ancient Iran, youths under 24 years of age received thorough training in the sport of their time which included miming, horsemanship, polo, dart throwing, wrestling, boxing, archery, and fencing. They were taught under conditions of severe hardship so that when the need arose they could endure the adverse conditions of war such as hunger, thirst, fatigue, heat, cold, etc.

As of 2015, only 20 percent of Iranians are physically active while the world average is 60 percent. 30% of Iranian youths never play any sports.

2012 Olympics
Iran achieved a significant victory in the London 2012 Olympics. The Iranian Team has won 13 medals including 7 Gold Medals. This is the best performance of a Middle Eastern country ever in the history of the Summer Olympics.

Sportswomen

Since 1979, women athletes have been subject to strict requirements when competing in Iran or abroad, with the Iranian Olympic Committee stating that "severe punishment will be meted out to those who do not follow Islamic rules during sporting competitions". The committee banned women athletes from competing in Olympic events where a male referee could come into physical contact with them. At the 1996, 2000, 2004 and 2008 Summer Olympics combined, a total of six women represented Iran.

In 2016, Iran made global headlines for the international female community after Iran got its first gold medal achieved by a woman. This also was a record in the MENA region.

Women athletes in Iran enjoy many freedoms.In 1979, there were only 1,000 female athletes in Iran, and now the number of female athletes has reached more than 1.4 million.  They are active in various disciplines such as football, handball, basketball, weightlifting, shooting, taekwondo, wushu, karate, boating, athletics, volleyball, rock climbing, and chess.

Prominent female athletes such as Zahra Nemati, Hamideh Abbasali, Nazanin Malai, Farzaneh Fassihi, Leila Rajabi, Elahe Ahmadi, Nahid Kiani, Sarasadat Khademalsharieh are well known among the Iranian people.

Iran sport organization

 1935: National Sports Association
 1960: Integration into the Education Ministry
 1971: Sports and Recreation Organization
 1977: Dissolution and fusion with the Education Ministry (for the 2nd time)
 1979–present: Independent Physical Education Organization (part of the Government)
 2011: Proposal in Parliament to merge the National Youth Organization with the Physical Education Organization.

Sports categories
 Championship sports: see also: National Olympic Committee of the Islamic Republic of Iran
 Sports education: see also: Education in Iran
 Public sport: see also: Health in Iran

Budget

The annual government's budget for sport was about $80 million in 2010 or about $1 per person.

Traditional sports

Bodybuilding
Bodybuilding is very popular among the younger generation. Some professional bodybuilders of Iranian descent include Baitollah Abbaspour, Javad Nabavi, Mohamad Farokh, Ali Tabrizi, Hamid Manafi and Zohair Al Karbelaie ("Arnold" of Fallah!)

Wrestling

Wrestling has a very long tradition and history in Iran and often even referred to as its national sport. There are many styles of folk wrestling, from Varzesh-e Pahlavani to Zurkhaneh which have similarities with modern freestyle wrestling.

Both freestyle and Greco-Roman wrestling, particularly freestyle, are popular in Iran. Mazandaran is the main power in the country and wrestling is part of its culture. Tehran, Kermanshah, Khorasan and Hamedan also produce many talented wrestlers.

With a history of great wrestlers, such as Gholamreza Takhti (two-time champion at freestyle wrestling World Championships: 1959 and 1961), Iran is considered among the elite nations in this sport.

Polo

It is believed that Polo first originated in Persia ages ago. The poet Firdowsi described royal polo tournaments in his 9th century epic, the Shahnameh. Polo competitions are the subject of many traditional paintings in Iran.

Despite the emphasis in Islam on learning the equestrian arts, in modern times, especially after the 1979 Iranian revolution, the equestrian sports fell out of favor in Iran, as they were associated with the aristocracy. However, recent signs suggest that it may be witnessing a comeback, with renewed interest in the sport.

Horse racing is a very popular sport between Turkmens of Iran, and there are two great Gymnasium of horse racing at Gonbad Kavous and Bandar Torkaman. Competitions are not international and not broadcast but considerable prizes are given to winners. Lottery only for horse racing (and archery) is not prohibited in Islam.

Board games

Chess

The origin of chess is a disputed issue, but evidence exists to give credence to the theory that chess originated in India and later it came to Iran.

Popular sports

Association football

Football is the most popular sport in Iran. Iran has been able to qualify for the FIFA World Cup six times (1978, 1998, 2006, 2014, 2018 and 2022), won the AFC Asian Cup three times (1968, 1972 and 1976), and four times has won gold medal at the Asian Games (1974, 1990, 1998 and 2002).

Particularly in the past 10 years, with the launch of Iran's Premier Football League; considerable progress has been made. Some Iranian players now play in major European leagues, and some Iranian clubs have hired European players or coaches.

Iranian clubs (Esteghlal and Pas) have three times won the Asian Club Championship (1970, 1991, 1993); but the last championship of an Iranian team at AFC Champions League dated back to the 1992-1993 season.

Like all other sports, adequate football facilities are limited in Iran. Iran's largest football stadium is the Azadi Stadium, with a seating capacity of 100,000. Home Stadium of Esteghlal and Perspolis (Most Popular Iranian Clubs) and where that national matches are held.

Basketball

In basketball, Iran has a particularly strong national team, and a professional league, with competitive players in Asia. The clubs have begun hiring strong foreign players and coaches into their roster. The national team participated in the 1948 Summer Olympics in London, finishing 1-3. They competed in the 2008 Summer Olympics in Beijing, thanks to their gold medal in the 2007 FIBA Asia Championship, their first ever continental crown. The first ever Iranian NBA-player is Hamed Haddadi.

Iran have made strides forward to develop their women’s national team program. Women's basketball has seen a lot of improvement.

Weightlifting
Strength sports like weightlifting, powerlifting and bodybuilding have always held favor among Iranians and with the recent success of world record-holding super-heavyweight lifter Hossein Reza Zadeh, or Sydney Olympics gold medalist, Hossein Tavakoli, the sport has been returned to a rather high status.

Kabbadi
Kabaddi also popular in Iran. The Iran national kabaddi team represents the Iran in The International Kabbadi.

Iran become Champions of Asian Games in 2018, and two times runner-ups in (2010,2014) and Also in world cup runner-ups in (2004,2007,2016)

Champions of Asian beach Games in 2012 and 2014.

Iran hosted the circle asia cup in 2011.

Skiing

Iran is home to numerous mountainous regions, many of which are suitable for skiing, and snowboarding and are gaining increasing popularity among foreign visitors.

Skiing began in Iran in 1938 through the efforts of two German railway engineers. Today, 13 ski resorts operate in Iran, the most famous being Tochal, Dizin, and Shemshak. All are within one to three hours traveling time of Tehran. Potentially suitable terrain can also be found in Lorestan, Mazandaran, and other provinces.

The Tochal resort is the world's fifth-highest ski resort at over 3,730 m at its highest Seventh station. The resort was completed in 1976 shortly before the overthrow of the Shah. It is only 15 minutes away from Tehran's northern districts, and operates seven months a year.

The Seventh station has three slopes. The resort's longest slope is the south side U shaped slope which goes from the Seventh station to Fifth station. The other two slopes are located on the north side of the Seventh station. Here, there are two parallel chair ski lifts that go up to 3,900 m near Tochal's peak (at 4,000 m), rising higher than the gondola Seventh station stations. This altitude is said to be higher than any of the European resorts.

At the bottom of the lifts in a valley behind the Tochal peak is Tochal hotel, located at 3,500 m altitude. From there a T lift takes skiers up the 3,800 metres of Shahneshin peak, where the third slope of Tochal is located.

Hiking and climbing sports

Due to the wealth of mountains, climbing sports are widely popular in Iran. Both the Zagros and Alborz ranges provide plenty of opportunities for the novice and advanced alike.

Hiking and trekking enthusiasts find opportunities in locations like Alamut and Tangeh Savashi to enjoy the rustic surroundings, as well as a relatively challenging climb.

Martial arts
Martial arts have gained popularity in Iran in the past 20 years. Kyokushin, shotokan, wushu, judo, and taekwondo are the most popular.

Iran competed in the International Judo Federation (IJF) until 2019, when it was barred after 2018 world champion Iranian judoka Saeid Mollaei said he was ordered to throw a match to avoid facing an Israeli judoka. The incident resulted in Mollaei's flight to Germany, after Iran persecuted him and his family in retaliation for the international humiliation.

Volleyball

In volleyball, Iran has a national team, and a professional league. The Iran national volleyball team is among the strongest teams in the world, and the Iranian Youth and Junior (Under-19 and Under-21) national teams are among the top three strongest teams in the world, winning medals in Boys' U19 Volleyball World Championship and Men's U21 Volleyball World Championship in recent years. In the 2007 Men's U21 Volleyball World Championship, the Iranians were successful at earning a bronze medal. Also, in late August 2007, the Iran national under-19 volleyball team surprised many by winning the gold medal in the Volleyball World Championship in Mexico, after beating France and China in the semi-finals and finals respectively and marking the first such international gold medal for an Iranian team sport.

Iran featured a men's national team in beach volleyball that competed at the 2018–2020 AVC Beach Volleyball Continental Cup.

Futsal

Futsal is practiced both at the amateur and professional levels. As of January 2019, Iran's men's national futsal team ranks 6th in world rankings after Brazil, Spain, Russia, Portugal, and Argentina. 

Iran has won the AFC Futsal Championship nine times out of ten and reached the FIFA Futsal World Cup finals five times. Iran also has a nationwide Futsal Super League.

Tennis
The tennis entertainer Mansour Bahrami is Iranian, as well as his tennis partner Ramin Raziyani.

Other sports

Another popular sport in Iran is rallying. Female drivers have been allowed to participate in national rally tournaments, including Iran's successful female driver Laleh Seddigh.

Attendance at sporting events

Since the 1979 Iranian revolution, though never explicitly declared in the law, women were barred from attending men's football, swimming and wrestling competitions. In April 2006, President Mahmoud Ahmadinejad speculated about allowing women back into the stadiums. It is uncertain if this measure would gain approval, since many hard-line clerics have voiced their opposition. However, women are generally free to attend indoor sports events.

See also
 National Iranian Olympic Academy
 Cycling Federation of the Islamic Republic of Iran
 Tourism in Iran
 Health care in Iran

References

External links
 Ministry of Sport and Youth Of Iran official website